Mnemosyne is a genus of planthoppers in the subfamily Cixiinae, erected by Carl Stål in 1866; it is the only extant type genus of the tribe Mnemosynini (which also contains 5 extinct genera).  Species are recorded from: South America, Africa, the Indian subcontinent, SE Asia and Australia.

Species
Fulgoromorpha Lists On the Web lists the following:

 Mnemosyne alexandri Löcker, 2006
 Mnemosyne anoriensis Van Stalle, 1987
 Mnemosyne apicifumata Van Stalle, 1985
 Mnemosyne araguensis Van Stalle, 1987
 Mnemosyne arenae Fennah, 1945
 Mnemosyne bergi Muir, 1926
 Mnemosyne bettotana Van Stalle, 1988
 Mnemosyne bornensis Van Stalle, 1988
 Mnemosyne braziliensis Van Stalle, 1987
 Mnemosyne camerunensis Distant, 1907
 Mnemosyne cixioides (Spinola, 1852)
 Mnemosyne colombiae (Walker, 1851)
 Mnemosyne comata Löcker, 2006
 Mnemosyne consoleae Van Stalle, 1987
 Mnemosyne cubana Stål, 1866 - type species
 Mnemosyne dohertyi Distant, 1907
 Mnemosyne dominicensis Van Stalle, 1987
 Mnemosyne ecuadorana Van Stalle, 1987
 Mnemosyne efferata (Walker, 1857)
 Mnemosyne evansi Muir, 1923
 Mnemosyne fasciata Van Stalle, 1987
 Mnemosyne ferrea (Walker, 1857)
 Mnemosyne flavicollis Van Stalle, 1987
 Mnemosyne frontistriata Van Stalle, 1987
 Mnemosyne fuscinervis Muir, 1926
 Mnemosyne granulata Van Stalle, 1987
 Mnemosyne hirata Melichar, 1904
 Mnemosyne hirta (Melichar, 1904)
 Mnemosyne kedaha Van Stalle, 1988
 Mnemosyne kutariensis Van Stalle, 1987
 Mnemosyne lamabokensis Synave, 1979
 Mnemosyne laticara Van Stalle, 1988 (Vietnam)
 Mnemosyne lefiniensis Van Stalle, 1985
 Mnemosyne levata Van Stalle, 1988
 Mnemosyne mabarumensis Van Stalle, 1987
 Mnemosyne musca (Breddin, 1905)
 Mnemosyne oblongostriata Van Stalle, 1987
 Mnemosyne ophirensis Van Stalle, 1988
 Mnemosyne pahangensis Van Stalle, 1988
 Mnemosyne perakensis Van Stalle, 1988
 Mnemosyne pernambucoensis Van Stalle, 1987
 Mnemosyne philippina Stål, 1870
 Mnemosyne planiceps (Fabricius, 1803)
 Mnemosyne pseudofasciata Van Stalle, 1987
 Mnemosyne punctipennis (Distant, 1906)
 Mnemosyne simula Van Stalle, 1988
 Mnemosyne sulawesiensis Van Stalle, 1988
 Mnemosyne tenensis Van Stalle, 1987
 Mnemosyne vegensis Van Stalle, 1987

References

External links 
 

Auchenorrhyncha genera
Hemiptera of Africa
Hemiptera of Asia
Hemiptera of South America
Fulgoridae